Beaufortia bracteosa is a plant in the myrtle family, Myrtaceae and is endemic to the southwest of Western Australia.

Description

The flowers are arranged in heads on the ends of the branches and have 5 sepals, 5 petals and 5 bundles of stamens.

Taxonomy and naming
Beaufortia bracteosa was first formally described in 1904 by Ludwig Diels in Fragmenta Phytographiae Australiae occidentalis. The specific epithet (bracteosa) is derived from the Latin word bractea meaning "scale" and the suffix -osa meaning "having many (or large) bracts".

Distribution and habitat
This beaufortia grows in sandy soils, sometimes with clay, gravel or loam often over laterite or granite. It occurs between Latham, Dumbleyung, the Wandoo National Park and Jilbadji Nature Reserve in the Avon Wheatbelt, Coolgardie, Esperance Plains, Geraldton Sandplains, Jarrah Forest, Mallee and Swan Coastal Plain bioregions of south-western Western Australia. It is an important component of kwongan vegetation.

Conservation
Beaufortia bracteosa is classified as "not threatened" by the Western Australian Government Department of Biodiversity, Conservation and Attractions.

References

bracteosa
Plants described in 1904
Endemic flora of Western Australia
Taxa named by Ludwig Diels